Irbid, known in ancient times as Arabella or Arbela, has the second largest metropolitan population in Jordan after Amman, with a population of around 1,088,100, and is located about 70 km north of Amman on the northern ridge of the Gilead
 
The city of Irbid has many men who built Irbid and Jordan, and they had a strong influence in the country

The following is a list of notable people from Irbid:

Military men 
 Abdullah el-Tell
 Mohammad Al-Malkawi
 Kayed Mufleh Obaidat
 Tawfiq Tawalbeh
 Najib Bataina
 Ali Khulqi Alsharairi
 Nawaf Jabr Al-Hamoud
 Qassem Al-Nasser

Politicians 

 Wasfi al-Tal
Mohammad Khasawneh
 Awn Al-Khasawneh
 Naji Al-Azzam
 Fahd Jaradat
 Abdul-Karim Gharaybeh
ّShafiq Rshaidat
 Fawzi Al-Mulki
 Hani Al-Mulki
 Hamad Farhan
 Mohammad Obiedat
 Ahmad Obeidat
 Toukan Hindawi
 Ahmed Al-koufahi
 Abdelraouf Al-Rawabdeh
 Saqr Malkawi
 Hasan Al-Tal
 Mohammad Taisir Al-Zinati
 Abdul Nasser Bani Hani

Poets 

 Mustafa Wahbi al-Tal
 Izz Al-Din Al-Malkawi
 Ahmed Al-Khatib
 Yousef Miqdadi
 George Haddad

Writers 
 Hani Al-Titi
 Kamal Malkawi
 Hashem Gharaibeh
 Adeeb Abbasi
 Suleiman Mousa
Qasem M. Koufahi

Researchers 
 Maroun Elias Nimeh Lahham
 Shahab Qur'an
 Abdallah Malkawi
 Mohammad S. Obaidat
 Ali Rababa
 Kamal Bani Hani
 Bashar alkhasawneh

Musicians 
 Abdo Mousa
 Ahmad Ghanem
 Ashraf Telfah
 Hisham Hamada
 Mondher Rayahneh
 Hussein Al-Salman
 Mahmoud Sayemeh
 Tawfiq Al-Nimri
 Mahmoud Radaideh

Athletes 
 Ahmad Hayel
 Laith Al-Bashtawi
 Mohammad Shatnawi
 Anas Al-Zboun
 Mohammad Balas
 Mounif Ababneh
 Hamza Al-Dardour
 Bashar Bani Yaseen
 Anas Bani Yaseen
 Mussab Al-Laham
 Mohammad Al-Alawneh
 Yasser Al-Rawashdeh
 Mallick Al-Qur3n

References 

Irbid